Shanghai 13, also known as The Shanghai Thirteen, is a 1984 Hong Kong-Taiwanese martial arts film written and directed by Chang Cheh and starring an ensemble cast of notable film stars such as Andy Lau, Jimmy Wang Yu, Ti Lung, Chen Kuan-tai, Danny Lee, Bryan Leung, David Chiang, Chiang Sheng, Chi Kuan-chun, Chan Sing, Lu Feng and more.

Despite not being a Shaw Brothers production, most of the casts and the crew are Shaw alumni.

Plot
During the Second Sino-Japanese War era in China, patriot Mr. Gao (Chiang Ming) is dissatisfied with the traitorous acts of the Reorganized National Government of China and together with thief Black Hat (Jimmy Wang Yu), he steals a traitorous contract set up by the government for the Japanese. Gao plans to bring the contract from Shanghai to Hong Kong and break it to the public, in hopes of exposing the traitorous acts of the Reorganized Government. Gao becomes the assassination target of the Reorganized Government's interior minister Hung Xu-wu (Seung Fung).

In order to ensure a smooth arrival of Mr. Gao and the contract to Hong Kong, Shanghai Tycoon Shen Gang-fu (Chen Kuan-tai) decides to send his underlings, the Shanghai 13, to protect Gao while on his way to the dock. Unexpectedly, there are moles among the 13 men who betray Gao and Shen. With obstacles ahead and pursuers behind, under the condition of obstruction by the traitors, can Mr. Gao successfully arrive to the dock? Are the Shanghai 13 loyal or evil? On the road to the dock, there are murderous traps everywhere and bloody battles appear one after another.

Cast
Andy Lau as Guan Wei, the Student
Jimmy Wang Yu as Black Hat
Ti Lung as Dock boss
Chen Kuan-tai as Shen Gang-fu
Danny Lee as Xiao Yang, the Black Sniper
Bryan Leung as Tao Da-ye, the Millionaire
David Chiang as Wanderer Ye Bu-fan
Chiang Sheng as Feng Jin-bang, the Smoker
Chi Kuan-chun as Big Leopard Yuan Hai
Chan Sing as Black Eagle Wu Da-li
Lu Feng as Tiger
Wong Chung as Laundry owner
Ricky Cheng as Dagger
Wong Ching as Bear Lee
Ga Hoi as Cheater at casino
Yu Chung-chiu
Chiang Ming as Mr. Gao
Chang Feng as Hung Xu-wu
Yip Fei-yang as Wai Siu Tin
Chu Hoi-ling as Tao Xiao-mei, Tao's younger sister and Guan's lover
Peter Chang as Xiao Long
Lee Chung-yat as Young Master Liang Xiao-xiong
Tsang Ming-cheong
Wong Chi-sang
Wong Tak-sang
Clement Yip as Lian Sheng
Sonny Yue
Cheung Tai-lun
Yau Siu-lam as Little Leopard Yuan Gang
Chan Ka-hoi as Wei Xiao-tian

Action Directors
Lau Kar-wing
Chiang Sheng
Lu Feng
Wong Kwok-chue
Ricky Cheng Tien-Chi

See also
Andy Lau filmography

External links

Shanghai 13 at Hong Kong Cinemagic

1984 films
1984 action films
1984 martial arts films
1980s chase films
Films about revolutionaries
Films directed by Chang Cheh
Films set in Nanjing
Films set in Shanghai
Hong Kong action films
Hong Kong martial arts films
Kung fu films
1980s Mandarin-language films
Second Sino-Japanese War films
Taiwanese action films
Taiwanese martial arts films
Wushu films
1980s Hong Kong films